Sanica is a village in the municipality of Ključ, Bosnia and Herzegovina. In November 2013, a giant sinkhole abruptly began forming where a pond had been. The postal code is 79285.

Demographics 
According to the 2013 census, its population was 1,337.

Notable people
 Šerif Konjević (born 1958), Bosnian pop-folk singer, born in Sanica

References

Populated places in Ključ